Bureau of Investment Promotion (abbreviated as B.I.P Rajasthan) is the in-charge agency for investment promotion and single-window clearances in the Rajasthan state of India. The main objective of the B.I.P is to promote investment in the state by supporting the investors. It is a bureau under the Government of Rajasthan.

Administration 
The Bureau is headed by an officer of Indian Administrative Service, who is the Commissioner and handles the overall supervision of the activities of the bureau. The present Commissioner is Dr. Samit Sharma (IAS).

External links 
 Official website of Bureau of Investment Promotion, Government of Rajasthan, Jaipur
 Invest Rajasthan: BIP: Our Team

References 

State agencies of Rajasthan
Economy of Rajasthan
Investment in India